Clarks Hollow is a valley in Warren County in the U.S. state of Missouri.

Clarks Hollow has the name of the local Clark family.

References

Valleys of Warren County, Missouri
Valleys of Missouri